Jajan (also Romanized as Jājan) is a village in Deraz Kola Rural District, Babol Kenar District, Babol County, Mazandaran Province, Iran. At the 2006 census, its population was 211, in 61 families.

References 

Populated places in Babol County